The ALTdot Comedy Lounge is a cabaret-style alternative comedy show in Toronto, Canada.

For over 21 years, the ALTdot Comedy Lounge has hosted alternative, non-traditional and new material, with drop-in guests from around the world. It runs every Monday at The Rivoli. The show was a product of the alternative comedy movement of the late 1990s, such as Largo and Uncabaret in Los Angeles and Luna Lounge in New York. The Kids in the Hall had a Rivoli residency show on Mondays in the 1990s. In 2005 a Tuesday show, The Sketch Comedy Lounge, was added and ran until 2011. The first Tuesday of every month there is an ALTdot Open Mic where the producer can see some emerging comedians showcase and one comic gets a spot on a future ALTdot.

The show is produced by Lorne Perlmutar.

Performers

Comedians

Sketch Troupes

External links

Performing arts in Toronto
Comedy clubs in Canada